Kenny Middlemiss (also known as Ken and Kenneth Middlemiss; born 19 June 1964) is a former Scottish badminton player. Kenny, is a 20-times National champion and has won 155 caps for the Scotland in badminton, highest ever by any British athlete. Ken has represented Scotland in the four consecutive Commonwealth games between 1986 and 1998 across three disciplines; reaching quarterfinals several times. He also played in World championships between 1989 and 1997. He has won titles mainly in European grand prix in Portugal, Ireland, Iceland, Slovenia, Spain & Austria. He also won one World grand prix tournament in United States besides couple of runner-up performances in France and Scotland. He is married to Elinor Middlemiss, another former player from his country.

Achievements

IBF World Grand Prix 
The World Badminton Grand Prix sanctioned by International Badminton Federation (IBF) from 1983 to 2006.

Men's singles

Mixed doubles

IBF International 
Men's singles

Men's doubles

Mixed doubles

References

External links 

1964 births
Living people
Sportspeople from Edinburgh
Scottish male badminton players
Badminton players at the 1986 Commonwealth Games
Badminton players at the 1990 Commonwealth Games
Badminton players at the 1994 Commonwealth Games
Badminton players at the 1998 Commonwealth Games
Commonwealth Games competitors for Scotland